Küllüce is a village in the Başmakçı District, Afyonkarahisar Province, Turkey. Its population is 191 (2021).

References

Villages in Başmakçı District